Montjustin is a commune in the Alpes-de-Haute-Provence department in southeastern France.

Population

Personalities
 Henri Cartier-Bresson was buried in the cemetery of Montjustin.

See also
 Luberon
Communes of the Alpes-de-Haute-Provence department

References

Communes of Alpes-de-Haute-Provence
Alpes-de-Haute-Provence communes articles needing translation from French Wikipedia